The 2021 BAL season was the 1st season for the Rivers Hoopers of the Basketball Africa League. The team began the season on May 16, 2021, in the season opener against Rwanda's Patriots BBC.

Coming off a third Nigerian Premier League, the team of Ogoh Odaudu qualified for the inaugural BAL season. Ahead of the season, the Hoopers signed Ben Uzoh, along with the American duo Chris Daniels and Taren Sullivan. They also signed ex-NBA champion Festus Ezeli. However, Ezeli got injured and had to miss the season. He was later replaced by Robinson Opong.

Roster

Team

Additions

|}

Regular season

|- style="background:#fcc;"
| 1
| 19 May
| Patriots
| L 83–60
| Taren Sullivan  (15)
| Victor Koko (5)
| Ben Uzoh (4)
| Kigali Arena2,000
| 0–1
|- style="background:#fcc;"
| 2
| 20 May
| US Monastir
| L 70–99
| Chris Daniels (25)
| Chris Daniels (11)
| Ben Uzoh (8)
| Kigali Arena412
| 0–2
|- style="background:#cfc;"
| 3
| May 19
| GNBC
| W 69–80
| Taren Sullivan (19)
| Victor Koko (9)
| Three players (3)
| Kigali ArenaTBD
| 1–2
|}
|}

Statistics

Source:

References

Rivers Hoopers